Conn Ua Mellaig (died 1202) was the Bishop of Annaghdown.

Ua Mellaig was a native of what is now County Galway, where his surname is now rendered Melia.

He attended the coronation of Richard I of England on 17 September 1189. He died in office in 1202.

Other bearers of the surname at Annaghdown included Bishop Tomas Ó Mellaig (c.1242-1247/50) and bishop-elect Tomás Ó Mellaig (fl. 1329).

See also

 Careena Melia, actress
 Cian Melia, Irish showjumper

References
 A New History of Ireland: Volume IX - Maps, Genealogies, Lists, ed. T.W. Moody, F.X. Martin, F.J. Byrne, pp. 322–324.

External links
 http://www.ucc.ie/celt/published/T100005C/
 https://web.archive.org/web/20160523012406/http://www.irishtimes.com/ancestor/surname/index.cfm?fuseaction=Go.&UserID=
 http://www.census.nationalarchives.ie/pages/1911/Galway/Galway_North_Urban/Mainguard_St__part_/901714/

Religious leaders from County Mayo
People from County Galway
12th-century Roman Catholic bishops in Ireland
13th-century Roman Catholic bishops in Ireland
1202 deaths
Year of birth unknown
Bishops of Annaghdown